The 2012 Gulf Ice Hockey Championship was the second Gulf Ice Hockey Championship. It took place between 28 May and 1 June 2012 in Abu Dhabi, the United Arab Emirates. The United Arab Emirates won the tournament after defeating Kuwait in the gold medal game, claiming their second title of the championships. Oman finished third after defeating Bahrain in the bronze medal game.

Overview
The 2012 Gulf Ice Hockey Championship began on 28 May 2012 in Abu Dhabi, the United Arab Emirates with the games being played at Zayed Sports City. The United Arab Emirates as host and defending champion returned along with Kuwait and Oman to compete in their second Gulf Ice Hockey Championship. Saudi Arabia who competed in the 2010 championship did not send a team while Bahrain made their first appearance in the competition. The four teams first competed in a round robin competition, with their ranking determining their seeding in the semi-finals. The United Arab Emirates finished in first place after the round robin and were seeded against fourth place Bahrain, while second place Kuwait was seeded with third place Oman. The United Arab Emirates and Kuwait both won their semi-finals and advanced to the gold medal game, while the losing teams advanced to the bronze medal game. The United Arab Emirates won the tournament after defeating Kuwait 3–1 in the gold medal game, winning their second championship title. Oman finished third after defeating Bahrain 5–1 in the bronze medal game.

Round robin
The four participating teams were placed in a single round robin. After playing the round-robin, the number one ranked team is seeded into a semi-final against the fourth ranked team and the second ranked team plays in the second semi-final against the team who finished in third place.

Playoff round

Bracket

Semi-finals

Bronze medal game

Gold medal game

References

Gulf
Gulf Ice Hockey Championship
Gulf Ice Hockey Championship
International ice hockey competitions hosted by the United Arab Emirates